The black-spotted false shieldback (Aroegas nigroornatus) is a species of katydid that is only known from the male holotype collected from Mpumalanga, South Africa. It is threatened by livestock grazing and changing weather patterns disturbing its microhabitat.

References

Tettigoniidae
Endemic insects of South Africa
Critically endangered insects
Insects described in 1916

Species known from a single specimen